Nordland Hospital Trust (Norwegian: Nordlandssykehuset, NLSH) is a part of the Northern Norway Regional Health Authority and covers the specialist health services for areas north of Saltfjellet in Nordland county. The trust consists of a number of units that were merged on 1 January 2002, following the government takeover of healthcare services. In addition, the trust manages several minor psychiatric treatment facilities in the county. Eivind Solheim was managing director of the trust until 2010.

The trust consists of four previously independent hospitals, including: 
Nordland Hospital, Bodø center (somatic), previously known as Nordland Central Hospital
Nordland Hospital, Rønvik (psychiatric), previously Nordland Psychiatric Hospital 
Nordland Hospital, Lofoten (Vestvågøy), previously Lofoten Hospital
Nordland Hospital, Vesterålen (Stokmarknes)

References

External links 
 
  
  

Health trusts of Norway
Hospitals established in 2002
2002 establishments in Norway